Moleen is an extinct town in Elko County, Nevada. The Geographic Names Information System classifies it as a populated place.

History
The first settlement at Moleen was made in 1869. In 1941, Moleen had 10 inhabitants.

References

Ghost towns in Elko County, Nevada